Josip Golubar (born 4 March 1985) is a Croatian footballer who plays as a midfielder for NK Podravina.

Career

Early career
Golubar played at youth level with hometown club Varteks (later renamed Varaždin). He spent much of his early senior career in the Austrian Landesliga.

Stegersbach
In 2008, Golubar signed with Austrian Regionalliga club SV Stegersbach. He made 15 appearances that season, scoring five goals.

Varaždin
In 2009, Golubar returned to Croatia and signed with First League side Varaždin, near his home town.

On 14 July 2011, Golubar made his European debut in the Europa League second qualifying round against Moldovan side Iskra-Stal. He went on to make four Europa League appearances that season, scoring one goal.

RNK Split
In winter 2012, Golubar signed with RNK Split.

Zavrč
In summer 2012, Golubar signed with Slovenian Second League side Zavrč. In his first season in Slovenia, he made 24 appearances and scored 13 goals, tying Amer Krcić for top scorer in the league. Zavrč won the league that season and earned promotion to the PrvaLiga.

In the 2013–14 PrvaLiga, Golubar made 32 appearances for Zavrč, scoring five goals, and helping the club to a fifth-place finish, missing out on a Europa League spot by five points.

Olimpija Ljubljana
In summer 2014, Golubar signed with Olimpija Ljubljana. He would make a total of thirteen league appearances for Olimpija before leaving the club in September 2015.

Second spell at Zavrč
Shortly after leaving Olimpija, Golubar returned to Zavrč for a second spell, making 17 league appearances and scoring four goals that season.

Second spell at Varaždin
In summer 2015, Golubar returned to Croatia and signed with Varaždin for a second spell, this time in the Third League.

Lučko
Midway through the 2016–17 season, Golubar left Varaždin to sign with Croatian Second League club Lučko. Over the remainder of the season, he made seven league appearances and scored two goals.

Third spell at Varaždin
After Varaždin earned promotion to the Croatian Second League, Golubar re-signed again on 6 July 2017. In the 2017–18 season he made 29 league appearances, scoring four goals, and scored the lone goal in Varažin's 1–2 Croatian Football Cup loss to Cibalia. He helped Varaždin to a second-place finish in the Croatian Second Football League, earning a spot in the promotion playoff against Istra 1961, which they lost 3–2 on aggregate.

On 23 January 2019, Golubar and Varaždin agreed to the mutual termination of his contract so that he could pursue opportunities abroad.

Valour FC
On 14 February 2019, Golubar signed with new Canadian Premier League side Valour FC. Golubar only got to play in three games for Valour during the 2019 Canadian Premier League season due to sustaining a season ending injury early on. On 29 November 2019, the club announced that Golubar would not be returning for the 2020 season.

Return to Neuberg
On 21 January 2020, Golubar signed with his former club SV Neuberg, now playing in the Burgenland 2. Liga Süd of the Austrian 2. Landesliga.

Varteks
Varteks

Honours
Zavrč
Slovenian Second League: 2012–13

Individual
Slovenian Second League top scorer: 2012–13

References

External links
PrvaLiga profile 

Austrian career stats - ÖFB

1985 births
Living people
People from Varaždin County
Association football midfielders
Croatian footballers
SV Stegersbach players
NK Varaždin players
RNK Split players
NK Zavrč players
NK Olimpija Ljubljana (2005) players
NK Varaždin (2012) players
NK Lučko players
Valour FC players
Austrian Landesliga players
Austrian Regionalliga players
Croatian Football League players
Slovenian Second League players
Slovenian PrvaLiga players
Second Football League (Croatia) players
First Football League (Croatia) players
Canadian Premier League players
Austrian 2. Landesliga players
Croatian expatriate footballers
Expatriate footballers in Austria
Croatian expatriate sportspeople in Austria
Expatriate footballers in Slovenia
Croatian expatriate sportspeople in Slovenia
Expatriate soccer players in Canada
Croatian expatriate sportspeople in Canada